Quiriego Municipality is a municipality of southern Sonora state,  in northwestern Mexico.

County seat
The town of Quiriego is the county seat of Quiriego Municipality. Quiriego is located east of Ciudad Obregón and is connected by dirt road with the main Federal Highway 15 at the village of Funcición.

Geography
The Quiriego Municipality area is 2,705.72 km².  It is within the Sonoran Desert.

Neighboring municipalities
Neighboring Municipalities are Rosario to the north, Álamos to the east, Navojoa and the state of Chihuahua to the south, and  Cajeme to the west.

Population
The Quiriego Municipality population count was 3,335 in 2005. The municipal population has been decreasing steadily since 1980 when it was 4,474.

History
The name Quiriego comes from the Latin words in the liturgy of the mass "kirie" lord and "ego" I. 

Located in this region are the ruins of the ancient Real de Minas y Villa de Baroyeca, which was one of the most important settlements in Sonora during the colonial period and beginning of the post-independence era.

Ruins of the former missions of Batacosa and Tepahui, founded in the eighteenth century, can also be seen.

The municipal seat, Quiriego, was originally a ranch belonging to Francisco Javier Valenzuela in the last years of the eighteenth century. Quiriego became a municipality in 1932.

Climate

Economic activity
Agriculture and cattle raising are the main economic activities.  Main crops are watermelon, sorghum, corn, beans, and grasses for cattle raising. There were 34,096 head of cattle in 2000. Gobierno de Sonora

See also
Spanish missions in the Sonoran Desert
Municipalities of Sonora

References

 Enciclopedia de los Municipios de México
 INEGI

External links
Sonora.gob.mx: Quiriego — ayuntamiento digital — Official website of Quiriego, Sonora (Spanish).

Municipalities of Sonora